Stanley is a rural municipality (RM) in the province of Manitoba in Western Canada. It is located in the southern part of the province, along its border with the state of North Dakota in the United States. Since 1876, the area made up part of the Mennonite West Reserve. The municipality has a population of 8,969 as of the 2016 Canada Census. The cities of Winkler and Morden lie geographically within the municipality but are separate urban municipalities.

Etymology
The municipality is named for The Lord Stanley of Preston, 16th Earl of Derby, Governor General of Canada from 1888 to 1893, namesake for the Stanley Cup, which he donated.

Geography
According to Statistics Canada, the RM has an area of 835.59 km2 (322.62 sq mi).  This does not include the areas belonging to the cities of Winkler and Morden, which are surrounded by the RM, in its north-eastern and northern sections, respectively.

Communities
 Blumenfeld
 Chortitz
 Friedensfeld
 Friedensruh
 Haskett
 Hochfeld
 Reinfeld
 Reinland
 Schanzenfeld
 Thornhill
 Neuenburg

Adjacent rural municipalities and counties
Municipality of Pembina - (west)
Rural Municipality of Thompson - (northwest)
Rural Municipality of Roland - (northeast)
Municipality of Rhineland - (east)
Pembina County, North Dakota - (southeast)
Cavalier County, North Dakota - (south)

Demographics 

See also
 Walhalla–Winkler Border Crossing

External links
 Official website
 Map of Stanley R.M. at Statcan

ReferencesBa

Stanley